John A. Reitz (1815–1891), known as the "Lumber Baron," was an American entrepreneur, industrialist, banker, civic leader, and philanthropist in Evansville, Indiana. Using the wealth generated by his enterprises, he and his family created a lasting legacy of philanthropy in Evansville. Reitz gave millions of dollars to various charities, churches and educational organizations.

Biography 

Reitz was born in Dorlar, Germany on 17 December 1815. At age 21, he left the family estate and emigrated to America, landing at the Port of Baltimore. He came to Evansville with the intentions of opening a pottery factory. The business was established, but due to poor demand was not profitable. Therefore in 1838 Reitz set out for Louisville for a year before again returning to Evansville. Around that time, in 1839, he married Gertrude Frisse.

Reitz went to work in the sawmill of Silas Stephens, who had built the first successful steam-powered sawmill in the area in 1837. John James Audubon had opened one earlier in Henderson, Kentucky, but it proved unsuccessful. In 1856 Reitz opened his own sawmill on the banks of Pigeon Creek. Soon, with the help of his sons, the Reitz sawmill had become one of the largest sawmills in the area. It operated 22 out of 24 hours a day, six days a week. Evansville was the largest hardwood market in the country over the period of 1845 through 1885.

Branching out into banking, Reitz organized the Crescent City Bank in 1856.  At one point he served as president and contributed largely toward making Crescent City one of the most substantial banking institutions in Indiana at the time.

His activity and success as a manufacturer and banker would alone rank him as one of the leading businessmen of the area, yet in other fields he attained equal prominence. He was one of the incorporators of the Evansville, Carmi & Paducah railroad, and was president of the company, which later became the St. Louis division of the Louisville & Nashville Railroad. He was also a director of the Nashville division of the same system from Evansville to Nashville, Tennessee, and was instrumental in advancing the interests of the Evansville & Crawfordsville Railroad. When the town of Lamasco was incorporated in 1846 he became its chief executive officer and managed its affairs until it was annexed into Evansville.

Reitz was elected and served as a member of the Evansville city council and in 1862 was sent to the state legislature as a joint representative from the counties of Vanderburgh and Posey, serving during a tumultuous session at the height of the Civil War. He was generally a Democrat but was not known to be a partisan.

Legacy 

Taken together, Reitz's various business ventures made him and his family very wealthy. As a memorial to his daughter Louise, who died in California, he built a large home for the Little Sisters of the Poor. Although a devout Roman Catholic (with membership at the Church of the Holy Trinity), he also gave freely to Protestant churches. He built at his own expense the Church of the Sacred Heart and presented it to the bishop as a place of worship for Irish Catholics.

Reitz was a liberal contributor to the building and maintenance of Evans Hall, dedicated solely to the cause of temperance. He and his family also erected Reitz Memorial High School and arranged financing for FJ Reitz High School. His home at the corner of First and Chestnut Streets in Evansville is now the Reitz Home Museum, the state's only Victorian house museum.

Reitz and his wife had a total of ten children, including Francis Joseph Reitz.

References 

People from Evansville, Indiana
American bankers
German emigrants to the United States
1815 births
1891 deaths
19th-century American businesspeople